Ernie Henry (September 3, 1926 – December 29, 1957) was an American jazz saxophonist.

Henry played in the late 1940s with Tadd Dameron (1947), Fats Navarro, Charlie Ventura, Max Roach, and Dizzy Gillespie (1948–49). From 1950 to 1952, he played in the band of Illinois Jacquet. After a few years in the shadows, he returned to play with Thelonious Monk (1956), Charles Mingus, Kenny Dorham, Kenny Drew, Wynton Kelly, Wilbur Ware, Art Taylor, Philly Joe Jones and Gillespie again (1956–57). He recorded three albums as a leader for the Riverside label shortly before his death at the end of 1957.

He died of a heroin overdose, aged 31.

Discography
Presenting Ernie Henry (Riverside, 1956) 
Seven Standards and a Blues (Riverside, 1957)
Last Chorus (Riverside, 1957) 
2 Horns / 2 Rhythm (Riverside, 1957) with Kenny Dorham

As sideman
With Matthew Gee
Jazz by Gee (Riverside, 1956)
With Dizzy Gillespie
The Complete RCA Victor Recordings (Bluebird, 1937-1949 [1995]
Gene Norman Presents Dizzy Gillespie in Concert (GNP Crescendo, 1948)
Dizzy in Greece (Verve, 1957)
Birks' Works (Verve, 1957)
Dizzy Gillespie at Newport (Verve, 1957)
With Thelonious Monk
Brilliant Corners (Riverside, 1957)
With James Moody
James Moody and his Modernists (Blue Note 1952)
With Fats Navarro
Memorial Album (Blue Note 1951 later released on 12 inch LP in 1956 as The Fabulous Fats Navarro)
Memorial (Savoy 1955)

See also
List of jazz saxophonists

References
Footnotes

General references
Scott Yanow, [ Ernie Henry] at AllMusic

1926 births
1957 deaths
American male saxophonists
Musicians from New York (state)
20th-century American saxophonists
American jazz alto saxophonists
20th-century American male musicians
American male jazz musicians